Vera Călin (born Vera Clejan; 17 February 1921, Bucharest, Romania - December 2013, Los Angeles) was a Romanian-born American literary critic, literary historian, essayist and translator.

Biography
Born into a Jewish family (her father, Herman Clejan, an architect, was the one who designed the Lafayette Galleries in Bucharest, present-day Victoria Department Store), Vera Călin was forced due to the anti-semitic laws to go to Jewish schools. She graduated from the Department of Letters and Philosophy of the University of Bucharest in 1946.

She made her literary debut in the summer of 1944 in the daily "Ecoul". Aftere World War II, she worked for a while as a copy editor for the publishing house "Editura de stat pentru literatură și artă" (ESPLA).

At the University of Bucharest, she taught in the beginning English language courses, and later courses in world and comparative literature, becoming a full professor in 1970.

Between 1977 and 1978 she was a visiting professor at a university in Jerusalem.

According to literary critic Mircea Martin, Vera Călin belongs to the group of members of the illegal Communist Party or its sympathizers (during World War II) who have tried not only to "relink with the internal traditions, but also with the European tradition and the whole world, both in the literary field and in the realm of ideas."

She was married to a physician, with whom she had two sons. After the husband's death in 1975, she emigrated to the US to her younger son in 1976.

She died in Los Angeles, California, in December 2013.

Selected works

Books 
 Furtuna în cancelarie, a play, 1956 (with Silvian Iosifescu)
 Pornind de la clasici, 1957
 Byron, Ed. de stat, 1961
 Curentele literare și evocarea istorică, Editura pentru literatură, București, 1963
 Metamorfozele măștilor comice, Editura pentru literatură, București, 1966
 Alegoria și esențele, Editura pentru literatură universală, București, 1969 (translation from German „Auferstellung der Allegorie”, Vienna, 1975)
 Romantismul, Editura Univers, București, 1970
 Omisiunea elocventă, Editura enciclopedică română, București, 1973
 Prea târziu: Însemnări californiene, Editura Univers, București, 1997
 Post-scriptum. Însemnări 1997-2002, Inst. Cultural Român, București, 2004

Translations 
 Cui îi bate ceasul, (For Whom the Bell Tolls by Ernest Hemingway) (în Viitorul, 1944?)
 Călătoriile lui Gulliver, (Gulliver's Travels), 1947
 Hamlet, ESPLA (with Maria Banuș)
 Jude Neștiutul, (Jude the Obscure by Thomas Hardy), Ed. Paralela 45, 2002

References

Sources 
 Vera Călin- o emigrație, Supplement to Observatorul cultural, 25 May 2006
 Al. Mirodan, Dicționar neconvențional al scriitorilor evrei de limb română, Minimum, 1986
 Encyclopaedia Judaica

External links 
 Observator cultural article about Vera Călin 
 Diary Excerpts, 2008-2009
 Obituary 

1921 births
2013 deaths
Romanian literary critics
Romanian women literary critics
Romanian essayists
Romanian women essayists
Romanian translators
Romanian literary historians
Academic staff of the University of Bucharest
American people of Romanian-Jewish descent
20th-century translators
20th-century essayists
Romanian emigrants to the United States